Brousko is a Greek television soap opera. Created by Vana Dimitriou, who has created successful series such as Erotas, combines elements of drama, mystery, adventure and occasionally comedy. The series stars Apostolis Totsikas, Andreas Georgiou, Eleni Vaitsou, Evelina Papoulia, Varvara Larmou, Nikoletta Papazafeiropoulou - Galanopoulou and George Zenios.

Plot 
A romantic and passionate love story. The love of two young people, Achilleas from Cyprus and Melina from Greece, could be based on the timeless story of Romeo and Juliet. It is a modern remake of the archetype myth, that is narrating the story of a big love.

Cast

Main cast 
 Apostolis Totsikas as Sifis Giannakakis
 Andreas Georgiou as Achilleas Matthaiou
 Eleni Vaitsou as Melina Aggelidaki
 Varvara Larmou as Anastasia Giannakaki
 Stefanos Mihail as Nektarios Matthaiou
 George Zenios as Diamantis Nikolaou
 Evelina Papoulia as Dafni Krotira
 Joyce Evidi as Konstantina Eleftheriou
 Julie Tsolka as Vasiliki Papadaki
 Alexandros Parisis as Minas Doukakis
 Koulis Nikolaou as Matthaios Matthaiou
 John Kakoulakis as Sifalakis

Recurring cast 
 Stella Kostopoulou as Loukia Antoniadou
 Nikos Verlekis as Pavlos Giannakakis
 Melpo Kolomvou as Evrydiki Matthaiou
 Antonis Karistinos as Markos Hatzis
 Stefanos Aidonis as Pandeli Siklomis
 Anatoli Grigoriadou as Angeliki Nomikou
 Pavlina Mavri as Dimitra Matthaiou
 Hristiana Theodorou as Hristina Lazarou
 Marinos Konsolos as Antonis Stavridis
 Elli Kiriakidou as  Andriani Matthaiou
 Hristina Adoni as Marina Matthaiou
 Terra Elle Perrie as Stefania Giannakaki

Seasons overview

Episodes and ratings 

Note: The dates and times are about the original airing in Greece.

References

External links 
 

ANT1 original programming
2013 Greek television series debuts
2010s Greek television series
Greek television soap operas
Greek-language television shows